Mista is the only studio album by Atlanta-based R&B youth quartet, Mista, released on July 30, 1996 via East West Records. Produced entirely by super-producers Organized Noize (TLC's "Waterfalls"), Mista was fueled by the release of the album's first single "Blackberry Molasses". According to Organized Noize producer Rico Wade:

"Blackberry Molasses" peaked at No. 13 on the Billboard Hot R&B/Hip-Hop Songs chart. The album's second single, "Lady" performed less well, peaking at number 61 in December 1996. Despite the success of "Blackberry Molasses", Mista peaked at No. 37 on the Billboard Top R&B/Hip-Hop Albums and has sold just over 100,000 copies since its 1996 release.

Track listing

References 

1996 albums